The Rüdigenspitze is a mountain of the Gastlosen, located on the border between the Swiss cantons of Fribourg and Bern. It lies south of Jaun.

References

External links
 Rüdigenspitze on Hikr

Mountains of the Alps
Mountains of Switzerland
Mountains of the canton of Fribourg
Mountains of the canton of Bern
Bern–Fribourg border
Two-thousanders of Switzerland